Asta Bowen is an American young adult writer. She's best known for her novel Wolf: The Journey Home.

Biography
'Asta Bowen was born in a family of Irish descent. She was raised in Orland Park, Illinois in Illinois.

She published her first book, The Huckleberry Book in 1988. Nine years later, her best known work, Wolf: The Journey Home was published.

From 1988 to 2001, she published a column in the Seattle Post-Intelligencer. She's also written for the Salt Lake Tribune.

She now teaches composition in Kalispell, Montana.

The wolf myth
'Asta Bowen writes young-adult fiction, with a focus on the myth of the wolf. In Wolf: The Journey Home, there is a scene where a wolf body allows to find the killer has been compared by the professor of American Literature and American Studies S. K. Robisch to a real poaching in the Yellowstone Park, against one male of the Druids wolf pack, named from Druid Peak, the first reintroduced in this park in 1996, where the killer has been apprehended because he kept the head as a trophy.

In the same study of wolf in American literature, he credits 'Asta Bowen to correctly portraits the role of the den location, to raise the new litter. There is virtually no anthropomorphism in this novel, the author describes real wolves, with some notable exceptions, deemed to be at the border of anthropomorphism, for example giving to the wolves names like Marth or Oldtooth.

British historian Karen Jones, specialized in the history of the American West, environmental history and Animal Studies, stresses upon the importance of such works in the environmental values transmission. She notes works like 'Asta Bowen "contain descriptions of intelligent canine protagonists that countered the images of bestial excess in traditional Euro-American wolf tales.".

Jones also notes, more strongly than Robisch the "humanistic traits" of the wolves: in Wolf: The Journey Home, she sees Marta as an "eco-feminist icon, a strong female character" and as "totem for positive gender identity".

Finally, she compares the myth to the Turner's Frontier Thesis: "Bowen's fictionalised rendition of lupine restoration involved copious quantities of pain, struggle, and death. This was a damming verdict on Turnerian triumphalism. Here the wolf story showed a West not won but lost. In Bowen's work, the wolf emerged as a potent signifier of frontier guilt, an expression that also proved common in commentary on the wolf reintroduction programme in Yellowstone in the mid-1990s."

Work reception
Her first novel, Wolf: The Journey Home, is well received and was nominated for the 2006 Teens' Top Ten award by the American Library Association.

Positions
Bowen depicts the role of the television as central in our society, and considers it detrimental to effective literature teaching.

Bibliography
 The Huckleberry Book (1988)
 Wolf: The Journey Home (1997)

References

External links 
 Official site 

20th-century American novelists
20th-century births
Year of birth missing (living people)
American young adult novelists
American women novelists
People from Orland Park, Illinois
Living people
20th-century American women writers
American women columnists
Women writers of young adult literature
Novelists from Illinois
21st-century American women